The official figure of war related deaths during World War II in Yugoslavia and the immediate post-war period, provided by the Yugoslav government in 1946, was 1,706,000 deaths. This number was proven to be exaggerated in later studies, particularly by statistician Bogoljub Kočović, who in 1985 estimated the actual war losses of the pre-war territory of the Kingdom of Yugoslavia at 1,014,000, and demographer Vladimir Žerjavić, whose 1989 estimate was 1,027,000 deaths. Kočović did not separate civilian and military deaths, while Žerjavić estimated that 53% were civilians, and 47% were members of various military forces.

Total number of deaths
The Yugoslav government estimated the number of human losses during World War II in Yugoslavia at 1,706,000. This figure was submitted to the International Reparations Commission in Paris in 1946. The Commission then requested a documented estimate of the number of casualties. The Yugoslav government gave the task of providing a "significant, but scientifically and statistically founded" death toll to a mathematician of the Federal Bureau of Statistics. The results of this research were demographic losses, encompassing deaths during the war, declining birth-rates, and migration, of around 1,700,000. Deputy Prime Minister Edvard Kardelj presented the demographic losses as actual war losses to support Yugoslavia's request for reparations. This number, equalling to 10.8% of its population, stayed the official estimate in Yugoslavia during its existence.

The Yugoslav censuses of war losses, conducted in 1944/1947, 1950 and 1964, did not confirm the claim of 1,706,000 deaths. The 1964 victims census was conducted for the purpose of negotiating war reparations for human losses and damage to infrastructure with West Germany. The census was requested by Germany as its government did not agree with negotiations on the basis of the official Yugoslav estimate at the time. The 1964 census resulted in a death toll of 597,323 for Yugoslavia. The results were declared a secret and were first revealed to the public in 1989. The census committee claimed that the census covered around 56-59%, or 60-65% of deaths. The Yugoslav censuses did not cover the deaths of Axis troops and the victims of Yugoslav Partisans.

In 1954, the United States Census Bureau estimated the war related deaths of Yugoslavia at 1,067,000. Estimates and calculations of the wartime population losses of Yugoslavia from Ivo Lah, a Slovene statistician, Croatian demographers Ivan Klauzer and Vladimir Žerjavić, and Serb statistician Bogoljub Kočović, ranging between 900,000 and 1,150,000, showed that the official Yugoslav government's figure was highly exaggerated. The most detailed estimates are those of Kočović and Žerjavić. The differences between them were very small, the calculated total number of victims for the pre-war territory of the Kingdom of Yugoslavia by Kočović was 1,014,000, and 1,027,000 by Žerjavić. The post-war borders of Yugoslavia included an additional 8,262 square kilometers of territory that was ceded from Italy.

From 2003, the Belgrade Museum of Genocide Victims has conducted a revision of the 1964 victims list, excluding deaths that occurred after 15 May 1945. As of 2019, the identified number of human losses is 657,290. Dragan Cvetković, a historian working at the museum, estimates between 1,042–1,092,000 human losses for the territory of the Kingdom of Yugoslavia, and 28,000 for areas ceded after the war to Yugoslavia.

By federal subject and ethnicity
Kočović's and Žerjavić's research showed that the highest war losses, compared to the expected population number in 1948, were in Bosnia and Herzegovina, Montenegro, and Croatia. In absolute terms, the highest losses were in Bosnia and Herzegovina, Croatia, and Serbia proper. The 1964 census of victims showed similar proportions.

The highest relative losses among ethnicities were among the Jews and Roma, and in absolute terms among Serbs and Croats. Kočović and Žerjavić differ in some of their categorizations of victims by ethnicity, largely in the case of the Montenegrin losses. According to Žerjavić, it represented around 4% of their expected population, and according to Kočović, more than 10%. Žerjavić said that Kočović took into account a "considerably larger" annual growth rate for Montenegro in the period of 1941–1948, compared to 1921–1931 and the registered annual growth rate in Yugoslavia after 1931.

Bosnia and Herzegovina

Croatia

Relative losses

Victim category

Independent State of Croatia

Civilian
Žerjavić's calculation of the civilian deaths in Croatia was 153,000, in Bosnia and Herzegovina 174,000, and in Vojvodina 46,000. The Independent State of Croatia (NDH) included the entire Bosnia and Herzegovina, most of Croatia, and a part of Vojvodina. The rough estimate of the total number of civilian deaths on this territory is 300–330,000. Kočović did not sort out the casualties by category.

Dragan Cvetković of the Belgrade Museum of Genocide Victims estimates that between 499–530,000 civilians lost their lives in the NDH. Among them were 66.5% Serbs, 10.2% Croats, 7.8% Muslims, 5.8% Jews, 4.9% Roma, and 4.9 others and undetermined. The estimate is based on a partially revised victims list from the 1964 Yugoslav census, excluding casualties that occurred after the formal end of the war. The civilian deaths in the NDH make up 73% of all civilian deaths in Yugoslavia.

Serbs
Kočović calculated the actual losses of Serbs in the NDH, both civilian and military casualties, at 370,000. With a possible error of around 10%, he said that Serb losses cannot be higher than 410,000. According to Žerjavić, 217,000 Serbs in the NDH died as "victims of fascist terror", of whom 93,000 died in camps, prisons and pits. Of that number, Žerjavić estimated that 78,000 were killed by the Ustaše at Jasenovac and in "prisons, pits and other camps", 45,000 were killed by German forces, 15,000 by Italian forces, 34,000 were killed in battles between the Ustaše, the Chetniks, and the Partisans, and 25,000 died of typhoid. 20,000 were killed in the German Sajmište camp.

According to Cvetković, the total Serb civilian deaths were 332–352,000. The Belgrade Museum of Genocide Victims estimates that 101,400–106,700 Serbs died in NDH concentration camps.

Croats and Muslims
According to Žerjavić, 70,000 Croats from the NDH died as "civilians, casualties of direct terror and camps": 33,000 in Croatia, 25,000 in Bosnia and Herzegovina, 2,000 in Srijem, and 10,000 abroad. Out of that number, excluding the casualties from abroad, 18,000 were killed by the Chetniks, 17,000 by NDH armed forces, 14,000 by the Partisans, 7,000 by German forces, and 5,000 by Italian forces. Around 1,000 Croatian Muslims were included in these calculations.

Cvetković estimates that 51-54,000 Croat civilians died during the war in the territory of the NDH. According to the Belgrade Museum of Genocide Victims, 11,900–13,100 Croats died in NDH concentration camps.

The civilian casualties of the Bosnian Muslims were 36,000, based on Žerjavić's research; 20,000 were killed by the Chetniks, 7,000 by the NDH armed forces, 4,000 by the Germans, 3,000 by the Italians, and 2,000 by the Partisans.

Cvetković estimates 39–41,000 Muslim civilian deaths. The Belgrade Museum of Genocide Victims lists 1,600–1,800 Muslims that died in NDH concentration camps.

Jews and Roma
For the Jewish population in the NDH, Žerjavić calculated 19,800 deaths in the country, and 7,100 abroad. Cvetković put the number of Jewish deaths at 29–31,000. The Ustaše were responsible for 74.7% of deaths, the Germans for 24.9, and the Italians for 0.4%.

Žerjavić estimated 16,000 Roma deaths in Croatia and Bosnia and Herzegovina. According to Kočović, the Roma war losses in Croatia were 15,000, and in Bosnia and Herzegovina 5,000.

The Belgrade Museum of Genocide Victims estimates that 22,200–23,800 Roma died in concentration camps of the NDH, out of a total of 24-26,000 Roma civilian casualties, based on Cvetković's research.

Military
Žerjavić estimated that 99,000 died as members of the NDH armed forces, during and after the war as POWs. Out of that number, 69,000 were Croats, 1,000 were Croatian Muslims, and 29,000 were Bosnian Muslims. He estimated that 50,000 Croats and 11,000 Bosnian Muslims died as members of the Yugoslav Partisans, both in the country and abroad. Regarding Serb military deaths in the NDH, 82,000 died in Yugoslav Partisan units, and 23,000 as "collaborators and quislings".

According to Cvetković, there were 191–206,000 combatant deaths in the NDH. 5–6,000 were members of the Royal Yugoslav Army, 149–157,000 were Yugoslav Partisans, and 37–43,000 were members of other military formations. 101–106,000 Serbs died as Yugoslav Partisans, and 6–8,000 as Chetniks.

Serbia

Serbia proper
Regarding Serb war losses in Serbia proper, Žerjavić provided the number of 80,000 civilian deaths, or 46,000 in concentration camps, 21,000 killed by German forces, 11,000 by Bulgarian forces, and 2,000 by the Chetniks. A further 39,000 died as members of the Yugoslav Partisans, and 23,000 as Chetniks and collaborators. The Jewish war deaths were 7,000. 13,000 Muslims died as civilians, members of Axis forces, or as Yugoslav Partisans, and 5,000 were Russians, Ukrainians, Germans, and others.

The revised 1964 victims census by the Belgrade Museum of Genocide contains the named list of 55,830 civilians that died in the Territory of the Military Commander in Serbia, which included most of Serbia proper and a part of Vojvodina. Of that number, 44,770 were Serbs, 6,254 were Jews, and 4,806 were other ethnicities or undetermined. Cvetković estimates that the total number of Jewish deaths in this territory was 11,400–11,700.

Vojvodina
In 2010, the Inter-Academy Commission was set up by the Serbian Academy of Arts and Sciences and Hungarian Academy of Sciences, to establish the number of civilian casualties within the post-war borders of Vojvodina from 1941 to 1948. Based on the published results as of 2015, until the formal end of the Second World War, 60,847 civilians lost their lives. 25,187 died after that date, from 1945–1948, and for 458 civilians the exact date of death was not determined. Of the total number of 86,492 civilians, 51% died in camps, 47% in extrajudicial executions, and 2% were sentenced to death. The highest number of deaths was in 1944, followed by 1942 and 1945. Until May 1945, most civilian deaths were caused by the German forces, followed by the Yugoslav Partisans, the NDH armed forces, and the Hungarian forces. After the end of the war, most civilian casualties were Germans who died in Yugoslav camps. Among the civilian deaths were 36.5% Germans, 31.2% Serbs, 16.9% Jews, 9.1% Hungarians, and 2.2% Croats.

Slovene Lands
The calculations of war losses for Slovenia by Kočović and Žerjavić are related to the area of the pre-war Drava Banovina only, excluding today's western Slovenia that was then a part of Italy. Žerjavić's calculation of war losses for that territory was 33,000: 32,000 Slovenes and 1,000 Germans. The total losses of Slovenes during and after the war were 42,000 dead, of whom 6,000 died abroad. Of the war losses among Slovenes in the Drava Banovina, 12,000 died as Yugoslav Partisans, 9,000 as Slovene Home Guards and members of the White Guard, and 2,000 that were forcibly mobilized in the German army. 9,000 were civilians. Žerjavić gave a rough estimate for western Slovenia of 10,000 deaths. Kočović provided a similar death toll as Žerjavić for the Drava Banovina of 35,000, of which 30,000 were Slovenes, 3,000 were Germans, 1,000 were Jews, and 1,000 were Roma. He estimated the total losses of Slovenes in Yugoslavia at 32,000.

After these two studies came out, several Slovenian researchers cautioned that the figures given for the Drava Banovina were too low. The Institute of Contemporary History in Ljubljana launched in 1995 an ongoing research on the war losses in Slovene Lands from April 1941 to January 1946. The published data as of 2012 showed that around 97,700 people died in the territory of present-day Slovenia in that time period. This represents a loss of 6.5% of Slovenia's population. The highest losses were in the Province of Ljubljana (9.5% of the population), and the lowest were in the Prekmurje region (1.9%). Of that number, 23,412 were civilians, 33,386 were members of the Yugoslav Partisans, the Liberation Front of the Slovene Nation and other pro-partisan military units, 15,276 were Slovene Home Guards, White Guards and Slovene Chetniks, 12,380 were mobilized in the German, Italian, or Hungarian army, 1,339 were others, while 11,952 are unidentified.

Migrations from Yugoslavia
The demographics losses due to emigration include those that were expelled from Yugoslavia, those that refused to return to the country from camps or from work abroad, and those that fled or emigrated for other reasons, up until 1948. Kočović's total estimate of emigrants was 654,000, while Žerjavić's was 669,000. The largest group in this category are the Germans. Their losses due to emigration were between 400–425,000. Yugoslavia's constitutive nations accounted for 150–155,000 emigrants.

Areas ceded from Italy
After the end of the war, the areas of Istria, Slovene Littoral, the cities of Rijeka and Zadar, and several islands were ceded from Italy to Yugoslavia, and its republics of Slovenia and Croatia. For the areas ceded to Croatia, Žerjavić in 1993 published the results of his research which showed that 32,000 people died in that area from 1941–1945. 16,000 were Italians, 15,000 were Croats, and 1,000 were Slovenes. For Istria and the islands of Cres and Lošinj, the war losses included 14,000 Croats, 9,000 Italians, and 1,000 Slovenes. For Zadar, the war losses were 4,000 Italians, largely due to Allied bombing of the city, and for Rijeka, 3,000 Italians and 1,000 Croats. For the Slovene Littoral, he provided a rough death toll of 10,000.

See also
 World War II casualties
 World War II reparations towards Yugoslavia

Footnotes

References

World War II casualties
Yugoslavia in World War II
Aftermath of World War II in Yugoslavia
Yugoslav casualties of World War II